Craig Kobel (born January 26, 1982) is a  former American football linebacker. He was signed by the Utah Blaze as a free agent in 2006. He played college football at South Florida.

Kobel has also been a member of the Philadelphia Eagles, Philadelphia Soul and New York Jets.

Early years
Kobel attended Santaluces High School in Latana, Florida and was a student and a letterman in football, wrestling, and baseball. In football, he was a two-time All-Area selection.

College career
At South Florida, Kobel tied Kawika Mitchell's single season record for most tackles for loss with 19,in 2003.

In 2004, Kobel recorded a team leading six sacks. Kobel also scored one touchdown.

Professional career

Tampa Bay Buccaneers
On August 29, 2005, Kobel participated in a rookie mini-camp on a try-out contract with the Tampa Bay Buccaneers.

Utah Blaze
In 2006 Kobel played offensive line and defensive line for the Utah Blaze of the Arena Football League. In 2006 Kobel rushed one time, for a one-yard touchdown. He also had 6.5 tackles.

Philadelphia Eagles
On January 23, 2007 Kobel was signed by the Philadelphia Eagles. Later the same day he was allocated to NFL Europa. In NFL Europa Kobel played for the Cologne Centurions.

Kobel was limited in the pre-season action by a sports hernia and underwent season-ending surgery. Kobel reached an injury settlement with the Eagles and was waived by the Philadelphia Eagles on August 28, 2007.

Team Florida (AAFL)
Kobel signed a contract as a draft pick with Team Florida of the All-American Football League.

New York Jets
Kobel signed with the New York Jets on June 9, 2009. He was waived on August 30.

References

External links
 Stats ArenaFan

1982 births
Living people
People from Lake Worth Beach, Florida
Players of American football from Florida
American football linebackers
South Florida Bulls football players
Utah Blaze players
Philadelphia Eagles players
Philadelphia Soul players
New York Jets players
Hartford Colonials players
Cologne Centurions (NFL Europe) players